Christopher Schaap (born October 30, 1991) is an American actor, director and writer.

Biography 
Schaap was born in Glendora, California and raised in Seattle, Washington. He graduated from Seattle University. Schaap's debut feature film, Prom King, 2010, has been shown at Frameline Film Festival in San Francisco, Outshine Film Festival in Miami, TLVFest in Tel Aviv, InsideOut Toronto LGBT Film Festival Outfest in Los Angeles  and Seattle International Film Festival. The film won Schaap a "New Vision Award" at San Jose's Cinequest 2017 Film Festival.

Filmography

Awards

References

External links 

Living people
American male film actors
American gay actors
LGBT film directors
People from Glendora, California
Seattle University alumni
American LGBT screenwriters
American gay writers
Film directors from California
1991 births
21st-century American LGBT people